Mouse Menace is a 1946 Warner Bros. Looney Tunes animated short film directed by Arthur Davis. The short was released on November 2, 1946, and stars Porky Pig.

Plot
There is a mouse invading Porky Pig's house, but so far Porky's attempts to get rid of the mouse have failed. Porky gets a cat to catch the mouse, only for the cat to get bound and launched out of the house. Next Porky borrows a mountain lion, but the mouse has petrified, stuffed and mounted the lion. Next Porky hires a gangster cat, but he leaves (portrayed by the same animations in reverse) straight after a bonk on the head with a bowling ball.

Without any success so far, Porky constructs a robotic cat. The mouse retaliates at the robot cat, which remains unaffected by a bowling ball, a flamethrowing boiler, dynamite and a pistol shot. The robot cat then blocks the mouse's ways into the mouse holes. The robot cat further resists the mouse's tricks from electrocution, more flamethrowing, decapitation and battering. Finally the mouse blows up the robot cat with a dynamite laced clockwork mouse, destroying Porky's house. Despite this, Porky Pig is relieved to be rid of the mouse, who then emerges to say "Shall I tell him?"

References

External links
 

1946 films
1946 animated films
1946 short films
Looney Tunes shorts
Warner Bros. Cartoons animated short films
Films directed by Arthur Davis
Animated films about mice
Porky Pig films
Animated films about robots
Films scored by Carl Stalling
1940s Warner Bros. animated short films
Films about cougars